Andreas Kalß (born 8 April 1982) is an Austrian ski mountaineer.

Kalß was born in Linz. He started ski mountaineering in 2003 and competed first in the 2005 Mountain Attack event. He has been member of the ASKIMO national team since 2008 and lives in Roßleithen.

Selected results 
 2006:
 8th, Loserrennen
 2007:
 1st, Bosrucklauf
 3rd, Friedl Gumpold memorial race
 2008:
 5th, World Championship relay race (together with Andreas Fischbacher, Martin Bader and Alexander Lugger)

References

External links 
 Andreas Kalß at skimountaineering.org

1982 births
Living people
Austrian male ski mountaineers
Sportspeople from Linz